Kangar may refer to:
Kangar, town in Perlis
Kangar, Iran
Kangar (federal constituency), represented in the Dewan Rakyat
Bandar Kangar (state constituency), formerly represented in the Perlis State Legislative Assembly (1959–86)
Kangar (state constituency), formerly represented in the Perlis State Council (1955–59)